Astro Arena is a Malaysian television station owned and operated by Astro. It is the first 24/7 Malay language sports channel in Malaysia. This channel can be viewed on channel 801 through Astro's Family Pack. Launched on 26 March 2010, it was the idea from the former Malaysian Minister of Youth and Sports YB. Dato' Sri Ahmad Shabery Cheek, together with the Olympic Council of Malaysia and Astro, to have a sports channel dedicated solely to the development of Malaysian sports.

Astro Arena is a 4-in-one channel featuring live local sports, a comprehensive 7-day-a-week coverage of local and international sports news, informative magazine and information programming and interactive viewer involvement.

The channel delivers 700 hours of live, local sports a year, with an additional 2000 hours of replays greatly expanding the amount of local sports available in the country. It also provides coverage of up to 56 hours a week of Malaysians competing at international levels or the best in world sports of a particular interest to the Malaysian audience.

Astro Arena is currently available for free-to-view on Astro customers and on NJOI customers in Malaysia on Channel 831 in Standard Definition (SD) format (for current NJOI customers only) and channel 801 in High Definition (HD) format (Astro customers & NJOI Prepaid).

From 23 January 2023, all esports content and eGG Network’s in-house shows will be made available through the company’s Bahasa Malaysia-based sports channels, Astro Arena (channel 801) and Astro Arena 2 (channel 802). 

On 24 February 2023, Astro Arena will rebroadcast the Malaysian League match since their last broadcast on 2014. It broadcasts the rematch that will officially start involving the Sumbangsih Cup action between Johor Darul Ta'zim (JDT) against Terengganu FC (TFC) via channels 803 and 804.

Channels

Astro Arena 2
Astro Arena 2 is the second channel of Astro Arena. Launched on 1 October 2021, it is broadcast in Channel 802 in HD. It airing localised coverage of international sports and sports news updates for Malaysian sport fans.

Astro Arena Bola
Astro Arena Bola is the third channel of Astro Arena. Launched on 24 February 2023, it is broadcast in Channel 803 in HD. It airing Malaysian League in 24 hours.

Astro Arena Bola 2
Astro Arena Bola 2 is the third channel of Astro Arena. Launched on 24 February 2023, it is broadcast in Channel 804 in HD. It airing Malaysian League in 24 hours.

Coverage

Current

Broadcasting rights

Football

Soccer 
 FIFA
 National teams
 Men's :
 FIFA World Cup 
 International Friendly
 UEFA
 UEFA European Championship 
 UEFA Nations League
 FAM
 Malaysia national football team 
 Malaysia national under-23 football team
 Malaysia women's national football team
 Malaysia FA Cup
 Men's :
 Malaysia Premier Futsal League 
 MFL 
 Malaysia Super League 
 Piala Sumbangsih 
 Malaysia Cup 
 Women's :
 Malaysia Premier Futsal League (Women)  
 AFF
 AFF Championship
 AFF Women's Championship
 AFC
 AFC Asian Cup
 AFC Champions League
 AFC Cup
 King's Cup
 Kirin Cup Soccer
 Merdeka Cup
 DFL (no broadcast since 2015 until 2020)
Bundesliga
 Eredivisie 
DFB-Pokal: coverage starts from round of 16

Badminton 

 BWF
 BWF World Tour
 World Championships
 Teams
 Thomas Cup (men's championship)
 Uber Cup (women's championship)
 Sudirman Cup (mixed team championship)
 Individuals
 Badminton Asia Championships (national teams (men's, women's, and mixed) and Individuals)
 Malaysia Purple League

Hockey 
 FIH
 Men :
 Men's FIH Hockey World Cup World Cups (including qualifiers for senior teams)
 Men's FIH Pro League
 FIH Junior World Cup 
Women's :
 Women's FIH Hockey World Cup
 Women's FIH Junior World Cup World Cups (including qualifiers for senior teams)
 Women's FIH Pro League 
 Asia Hockey
 Men :
 Men's Hockey Asia Cup 
Women :
 Women's Hockey Asia Cup 
 MHC
 Sultan Azlan Shah Cup
 Malaysia Hockey League

Netball 
 Asian Netball Championships
 Netball World Cup

Sepak takraw 

 ISTAF
 Sepak Takraw League (including Champions Cup tournament)

Motorsport 
 Asia Road Racing Championship
 Malaysia Superbike Championship

e-Sports 
 Mobile Legends: Bang Bang
 MPL MY Season 11
 PUBG Mobile
 PUBG Mobile Pro League S7 (PMPL MY 2023)
 PUBG Mobile Super League 2023 (PMSL 2023)

Multi-sport events 
 Commonwealth Games
 Summer Olympic Games
 Winter Olympic Games
 Asian Games
 SEA Games

Former

Football

Soccer 
 MFL 
 Malaysia Premier League (until 2014)
 Malaysia Challenge Cup (until 2019)

Hockey 

 Sultan of Johor Cup (until 2014)

Motorsport 

 Malaysia Championship Series (until 2019)
 Malaysia Speed Festival (until 2019)

Shows
 Formasi
 Formasi Ekstra
 Forum
 Grandstand Ahad
 Kafe Sukan
 Masa Tambahan
 Nadi Arena
 Raket
 Bola@Mamak
 Arena Sukan
 Sehari Bersama
 Flik
 Dengan Izin
 Sorakan 12
 Masa Tambahan – Arena Bola
 Masa Tambahan – Antarabangsa
 Arena Bola
 Deskripsi Nadi Arena – DNA
 Jalur 14 (Exclusive programme from previous eGG Network's show)
 FYP (Exclusive programme from previous eGG Network's show)

See also
 Astro SuperSport
 Astro

References

External links
 www.arena.my

Astro Malaysia Holdings television channels
Television stations in Malaysia
Sports television in Malaysia
Television channels and stations established in 2010